The Rhine Glacier was a glacier during the last glacial period and was responsible for the formation of the Lake Constance.

References

Glaciers of Switzerland
Rhine